Agent may refer to:

Espionage, investigation, and law 
, spies or intelligence officers
 Law of agency, laws involving a person authorized to act on behalf of another 
 Agent of record, a person with a contractual agreement with an insurance policy owner
 Election agent, a person responsible for the conduct of a political campaign
 Free agent, a sports player who is eligible to sign with any club or franchise
 Literary agent, an agent who represents writers and their written works
 Modeling agency, a person or a corporation which represents fashion models
 Press agent, a professional publicist
 Foreign agent, a person who carries out the interests of a foreign country 
 Political agent (disambiguation) 
 Patent attorney, an attorney who represents clients in patent matters
 Real estate agent, an intermediary between sellers and buyers of real estate
 Registered agent, in the US, receives service of process for a party in a legal action
 Shipping agent, a person responsible for handling shipments and cargo
 Sports agent, a legal representative for professional sports figures such as athletes and coaches
 Talent agent or booking agent, a person who finds jobs for entertainment professionals
 Trade mark agent, a person who represents clients in trade mark matters
 Travel agent, a retailer that provides travel and tourism related services
 Special agent, an American criminal investigator or detective for example

Arts and entertainment

Fictional characters
 Agent (comics), a Marvel Comics character
 Agent (The Matrix), a group of characters in the series
 The Agents, superhuman characters in Seven Samurai 20XX

Film and television 
 The Agent (1922 film), featuring Oliver Hardy
 Agent (film), an upcoming spy thriller film
 Agent (TV series), a Polish reality competition

Music 
 Agent (band), an American hardcore band from Long Island, New York
 Agents (Finnish band), a Finnish schlager/rock'n'roll band
 The Agents (Australian band), led by James Griffin
 The Agents (English band), a Bristol post-punk band
 "Intro: The Agent", by Rhymefest from El Che (2010)
 "The Agent" (Little Man Tate song) (2006)

Other uses in arts and entertainment
 Agent (video game), a stealth action game

Science and technology

Biology and chemistry 
 Biological agent, a bacterium, virus, protozoan, parasite, or fungus used as a weapon
 Chemical agent, used as a chemical weapon

Computing 
 Agent architecture, a blueprint for software agents and control systems
 Agent-based model, a computational model for simulating the actions and interactions of individuals
 Intelligent agent, an autonomous, goal-directed entity which observes and acts upon an environment
 Software agent, a piece of software that acts for a user or other program
 User agent, software that is acting on behalf of a user

Other uses 
 Agency (philosophy), the capacity of an actor to act in a given environment
 Agency (psychology), an attribute of humans and non-human animals
 Agent (economics), an actor and decision maker in a model
 Agent (grammar), in linguistics, the thematic relation of a cause or initiator to an event
 Agent noun, a word identifying an actor, derived from a word denoting an action
 Cleaning agent, a substance used to remove bad smells, clutter, dirt, dust, or stains on surfaces

See also 
 
 
 Agency (disambiguation)
 Agent 13 (disambiguation)
 Agent X (disambiguation)
 Bot (disambiguation)
 Get Smart, an American comedy TV series which parodies the secret agent genre
 Secret Agent (disambiguation)